The 2011–12 Biathlon World Cup – World Cup 9 was held in Khanty-Mansiysk, Russia, from 16 March until 18 March 2012.

Schedule of events

Medal winners

Men

Women

Achievements

 Best performance for all time

 , 69th place in Sprint
 , 81st place in Sprint
 , 28th place in Pursuit
 , 38th place in Pursuit
 , 46th place in Pursuit
 , 50th place in Pursuit
 , 5th place in Mass Start
 , 17th place in Sprint
 , 24th place in Sprint, 20th in Pursuit and 7th in Mass Start
 , 24th place in Pursuit
 , 26th place in Pursuit
 , 37th place in Pursuit

 First World Cup race

 , 32nd place in Sprint
 , 48th place in Sprint
 , 33rd place in Sprint
 , 34th place in Sprint
 , 39th place in Sprint

References 

- World Cup 9, 2011-12 Biathlon World Cup
Biathlon World Cup - World Cup 9, 2011-12
March 2012 sports events in Europe
Biathlon competitions in Russia
Sport in Khanty-Mansiysk